Grudna  is a village in the administrative district of Gmina Miedzichowo, within Nowy Tomyśl County, Greater Poland Voivodeship, in west-central Poland.

The village has a population of 220.

Notable residents
 Armin Thiede (1917–1943), Wehrmacht officer

References

Villages in Nowy Tomyśl County